Francisco Pomares Ortega (born 21 September 1998), sportingly known as Kiko, is an Andorran international footballer who plays for FC Jove Español San Vicente as a left-back.

Born in Spain, he qualifies to play for Andorra through his mother. His father is from Elche.

International career
Kiko Pomares played his first international game with the national team on 21 March 2018, in a friendly against Liechtenstein.

References

External links
Kiko at FutbolEsta.com (in Spanish)

1998 births
Living people
People from Alacantí
Sportspeople from the Province of Alicante
Andorran footballers
Andorra international footballers
Andorra under-21 international footballers
Andorra youth international footballers
Spanish people of Andorran descent
People with acquired Andorran citizenship
Andorran people of Spanish descent
Spanish footballers
Footballers from the Valencian Community
Association football fullbacks
Tercera División players
Elche CF Ilicitano footballers